David Louis Eilers (born December 3, 1936) is an American former professional baseball pitcher who worked in 81 games—all in relief—for the Milwaukee Braves, New York Mets and Houston Astros of Major League Baseball between  and .

Eilers began his professional career in the Braves' organization in 1959.

He was selected in the 1966 minor league draft by Houston, and in 1967, his last season in the majors, he worked in 35 games, most of his big-league career. He also set personal bests in games won (6), innings pitched (59), earned run average and strikeouts (27). He retired from pro baseball in 1969.

In his 81-game major league career, Eilers won eight games, lost six, and saved three. He allowed 146 hits and 29 bases on balls in 123 innings pitched, and was credited with 37 games finished. He had 52 strikeouts.

References

External links

Baseball-Almanac

1936 births
Living people
Atlanta Crackers players
Austin Senators players
Baseball players from Texas
Boise Braves players
Eau Claire Braves players
Houston Astros players
Jacksonville Suns players
Major League Baseball pitchers
Midland Braves players
Milwaukee Braves players
New York Mets players
Oklahoma City 89ers players
People from Fayette County, Texas
Toronto Maple Leafs (International League) players
Yakima Braves players